The Society of Engravers was founded in London in 1802 to promote British printmaking, largely because engravers were not allowed (unless they were also painters or sculptors) to join the Royal Academy, and also to enable "each individual to act with more firmness in opposing the pretensions ... of booksellers and publishers".  The first President was Francesco Bartolozzi, himself in fact an R.A..  The Royal Watercolour Society (as it later became) was founded in 1804 for similar reasons.  The society is described as "short-lived".

Later Presidents included William Bond, and James Parker, James Pastorini and Thomas Milton were Governors.

See also
Royal Society of Painter-Etchers and Engravers founded 1880

References

British artist groups and collectives
19th-century art groups
1802 establishments in the United Kingdom
British art